Emily Dievendorf is an American politician from Michigan. She serves in the Michigan House of Representatives, representing the 77th district.

Dievendorf is from Kalamazoo, Michigan. She moved to Lansing in 1997 to enroll at Michigan State University. She had an internship with the Michigan State Legislature and stayed in Lansing after graduating, working for Alexander Lipsey and Andy Coulouris. She then joined Equality Michigan, becoming their executive director. Dievendorf and Fae Mitchell opened The Resistance, a bookstore in Lansing, in 2022.

Dievendorf first ran for the Michigan House in 2022.

Dievendorf is bisexual and nonbinary.

Notes

References

Living people
Michigan State University alumni
Democratic Party members of the Michigan House of Representatives
Bisexual politicians
Non-binary politicians
Bisexual non-binary people
LGBT state legislators in Michigan
Politicians from Kalamazoo, Michigan
Politicians from Lansing, Michigan
21st-century American politicians